The Ultimate is an album by American jazz drummer Elvin Jones recorded in 1968 and released on the Blue Note label. It is his second album featuring his trio with saxophonist/flautist Joe Farrell and bassist Jimmy Garrison.

Reception
The Allmusic review by Scott Yanow awarded the album 4½ stars and stated "This is one of Joe Farrell's finest recordings. Switching between tenor, soprano and flute, Farrell had to be good because he was joined in the pianoless trio by bassist Jimmy Garrison and drummer Elvin Jones... Farrell is in consistently creative form but Garrison's occasional solos and Jones's polyrhythmic accompaniment are also noteworthy".

Track listing
 "In the Truth" (Joe Farrell) - 5:04
 "What Is This?" (Jimmy Garrison) - 7:09
 "Ascendant" (Garrison) - 5:13
 "Yesterdays" (Otto Harbach, Jerome Kern) - 5:39
 "Sometimes Joie" (Garrison) - 10:38
 "We'll Be Together Again" (Carl Fischer, Frankie Laine) - 3:05

Personnel
Elvin Jones - drums
Joe Farrell - tenor saxophone, soprano saxophone, flute
Jimmy Garrison - bass

References

Blue Note Records albums
Elvin Jones albums
1969 albums
Albums recorded at Van Gelder Studio
Albums produced by Duke Pearson